Marilyn W. Atkinson (born February 18, 1943) is the founder and President of Erickson Coaching International. She is a speaker, coach, Master coach trainer, Master NLP trainer, writer, designer of coach training program The Art & Science of Coaching  Atkinson was a student of Milton Erickson, and it was his mentorship and guidance that inspired her to name the company after him.

For the past thirty years she has been developing both corporate and specialized coach training programs including the ICF accredited coach training program (ACTP) The Art and Science of Coaching. A former Registered Psychologist, Atkinson is also a neuro-linguistic programming (NLP) Master Trainer and a specialist in Ericksonian Communications. In the mid 1990s she began developing formal business coach training programs that have been widely successful with Fortune 500 Companies such as SAP, Mercedes Benz, American Express, Canada Post, Occidental Petroleum, and Russia's Sberbank.
She travels to Russia, Europe, and Asia throughout the year to lead Erickson training programs.
Erickson Coaching programs, accredited by the International Coach Federation, are in place in 36 countries worldwide.

Personal life 
Atkinson was born in Vancouver, British Columbia, Canada on February 18, 1943. Her Father Ross Millard died of cancer when she was two years old. Her Mother Mildred Millard later remarried.

When Atkinson was 13 years old she wrote a letter to philosopher Bertrand Russell and was delighted to receive a return letter. An avid reader at a young age, Atkinson was inspired to continue studying and reading.

In 1961 Atkinson married William Gossen. Together they had two children Kailie Gossen (born 1963) and Paul Gossen (born 1967). Atkinson and William divorced in 1970.

1981–1991 Atkinson was married to David Atkinson (she kept his surname).

2000–present Atkinson is married to Lawrence McGinnis.

Career 

In November 1965 Atkinson completed her BA in Sociology with High Honors from the University of Saskatchewan at Regina, and was awarded the University Prize Award.
Three years later, also at the University of Saskatchewan at Regina Atkinson completed her Masters in Clinical Psychology (October 1968). Her thesis topic was “Ethics of Generosity and Borrowing Lending Behavior: An Exploration Into Motivation”.
In 1968 Atkinson was accepted into membership with the B.C. Psychology Association with specialty areas in Education, and Industrial Psychology.

1970–1980 was an intensive period of continued learning for Atkinson. She completed Gestalt Training with Fritz Perls, 4 years of training with The Primal Institute, The San Vicente Drug Program, and The Denver Certified Primal Therapists Program. She also took a two-year course on public speaking, and developing presentations.

Between 1976 and 1985 Atkinson was the Managing Director of Marilyn Atkinson and Associates, alongside running her own private practice in clinical psychology. During this time she developed, coordinated, and led workshops training counselors through The Vancouver Center for Feeling Therapy.

1980–1983 She took Neuro-linguistic Programming Course Development Training, held at the University of California, Santa Cruz and achieved her certification as an NLP Trainer.

From 1983 to 1988 Atkinson honed her skills as a Master Trainer designing programs to train trainers in advanced communications and expert performance modeling. During this time she continued to learn from world leaders in communication including: John Grinder, Richard Bandler, Virginia Satir, Wyatt Woodsmall, Stephen Gilligan, Robert Dilts, and Stephen Lankton.

In 1980 Atkinson opened NLP Institutes of Canada and conducted professional trainings in NLP, Ericksonian Hypnosis, and Psychotherapy Training and Development. She created programs, wrote manuals and syllabuses, trained course leaders and lead courses in Toronto, Vancouver, and Windsor.

1992 Atkinson changed the company name to NLP B.C. and continued developing courses, training materials, and training. She had a staff of seven people.

In 1994, NLP B.C. began formally doing business as Erickson College.

Atkinson’s work emphasizes cross-cultural directions and focuses on a revitalized self-development coaching approach. Through her work in developing coaches and coach trainers throughout North America, Europe, and Asia, over 45 000 coaches have been trained in the last 35 years. Her programs have been used to instigate brand new policies in the field of education, social work, and drug and alcohol treatment. She has led various types of corporate and leadership training programs in as many as 60 cities around the world, and her work with 4 Quadrant Thinking has added a vital specialization in the field of accelerated learning technologies.

Some conflicting opinions exist around the methods of language learning that Atkinson teaches, and at times her definition of coaching has been received with skepticism

In 1990's,amazed by Powell Janulus, who entered the Guinness Book of World Records for fluency in 42 languages, she started modelling him and the book "Velocity Instant Fluency"  came out as a result.

World Game Conference 

In October 2012 Atkinson launched the First International World Game Conference, hosted in London, England.
In 2015 she is publishing the book named "Do you want to play World game?"  
She empowers, encourage and engage individuals and organizations who want to make a difference through their personal development and life legacy.

Atkinson asserts that, “together we can create a story that is far bigger than the individual, a vision of emergence throughout the world that allows us all to be proud of who we are and what we have already accomplished, and to want to contribute further. This is exactly the mood, the quality of love, and contribution that is at the heart of the world game- the giant ‘WE’ that unites us.”

Publications 

Atkinson M. Expanding Out to Home: All of Us Alling All of It All of the Time,  Anchorpoint Magazine 1998: 31. 

Atkinson M. Discovering Balance: the Stateline Exercise. Anchor Point Magazine 2001; 15 (7): 28-32.

Co-authored with Rae T. Chois the trilogy, The Art and Science of Coaching.

Atkinson, Marilyn; Chois, Rae T. (2007). The Art and Science of Coaching: The Inner Dynamics of Transformational Conversations. Vancouver: Exalon Publishing. pp. 209 .

Atkinson, Marilyn; Chois, Rae T. (2007). The Art and Science of Coaching: The Step-by-Step System to Transformational Conversations. Vancouver: Exalon Publishing. pp. 250 .

Atkinson, Marilyn; Chois, Rae T. (2011). The Art and Science of Coaching: Process and Flow. Vancouver: Exalon Publishing. pp. 304 .

Atkinson, Marilyn. (2013). Creating Transformational Metaphors. Vancouver: Exalon Publishing. pp. 161 .

Atkinson, Marilyn. (2015).Do You Want To Play The World Game? 

Atkinson, Marilyn; Paul Gossen (2015).Velocity Instant Fluency 

Atkinson, Marilyn; Stefanyi, Peter. '4Q Dynamic Intelligence' (2018). Exalon Publishing, LTD, ISBN 9780978370480.

References 

1943 births
Living people